Tony Soper (born 10 January 1929) is a British naturalist, author and broadcaster.

Life and career 
Soper was educated at Hyde Park Elementary School and at Devonport High School for Boys, both in Plymouth. He joined the BBC at 17 as a "youth-in-training", subsequently graduating by way of studio manager to features producer in radio, then moved into television. Among the radio programmes he produced were Birds In Britain.

Soper co-founded the BBC's Natural History Unit as its first film producer, with Patrick Beech the then South West Controller. Cutting his teeth on the LOOK series he organised far-flung wildlife filming projects. He presented live television programmes, including Birdwatch, Birdspot, Discovering Birds, Discovering Animals, Beside the Sea, Wildtrack and Nature. Soper also co-presented Animal Magic with Johnny Morris for a few years in the 1960s. For many years he also had a regular column in the RSPB members' magazine.

As Expedition Leader and a pioneer of wildlife cruising, he has spent the last twenty years exploring both polar regions. He holds a British Yachtmaster's certificate and is a qualified compressed air, oxygen, hard hat diver.

Soper's wife Hilary is a wildlife painter, and they have two sons.

Honours 
He is a recipient of the British Naturalists' Association Peter Scott Memorial Award.

DVDs
A single 23-minute episode of Wildtrack is available as a bonus feature on the DVD and Blu-ray release of David Attenborough's 1979 series Life on Earth.

Bibliography
(incomplete)
The Bird Table Book (1965, several editions to 2006)The Shell Guide to Beachcombing (1972)Wildlife Begins at Home (1975)Everyday Birds (1976)Wildlife of The Dart Estuary (1982)Discovering Birds (1983)Penguins [with John Sparks] (1987)A Passion For Birds (1988)Owls [with John Sparks] (1995)Wildlife of the North Atlantic (2008)The Arctic: A Guide to Coastal Wildlife (2012)The Northwest Passage (2012)Antarctica: A Guide to the Wildlife'' (2013)

References

External links
Tony Soper's Home page

1929 births
British ornithologists
British television presenters
British television producers
Living people